Ting Pang-hsin (28 November 1936 – 30 January 2023) was a Chinese linguist, and an academician of the Academia Sinica.

Biography
Ting was born in Ju-kao County (Rugao County), Kiangsu (Jiangsu), on 28 November 1936. After the defeat of the Kuomintang by the Chinese Communist Party in 1949, Ting relocated to Taiwan. He attended National Taiwan University, where he earned his bachelor's degree in 1959 and master's degree in 1963 both in Chinese literature. He went on to receive his doctor's degree from the University of Washington in 1969.

Ting worked at the Academia Sinica after university. He was elected assistant research fellow in August 1964, associate research fellow in February 1970, and research fellow in August 1975. In August 1981, he was named acting director of the Institute of History and Philology, confirmed in March 1985. He was a professor of National Taiwan University from 1975 to 1989 and the University of California, Berkeley from 1989 to 1994. In 1996, he was chosen as dean of the School of Humanities and Social Sciences, Hong Kong University of Science and Technology, a post he kept until 2004. 

Ting died on 30 January 2023, at the age of 86.

Publications

Honours and awards
 1986 Member of the Academia Sinica
 2000 Honorary Member of the Linguistic Society of America

References

1936 births
2023 deaths
People from Rugao
National Taiwan University alumni
University of Washington alumni
Linguists from China
Members of Academia Sinica